José Rojas may refer to:

 José María Rojas Garrido (1824-1883), Colombian politician and former acting President
 José Rojas (basketball) (born 1923), Mexican Olympic basketball player
 José Rojas (skier) (born 1970), Spanish Olympic skier
 José Manuel Rojas (footballer, born 1952), Costa Rican footballer
 José Rojas (footballer, born 1983), Chilean footballer
 José Joaquín Rojas (born 1985), Spanish road racing cyclist
 José Manuel Rojas (footballer, born 1987), Spanish footballer
 José Antonio Rojas (born 1987), Chilean footballer
 Jose Rojas (racquetball) (born 1990), American racquetball player
 José Luis Rojas (born 1992), Peruvian runner
 José Rojas (baseball), baseball player